Gashur-e Aliabad (also Romanized as Gashūr-e ‘Alīābād) is a village in Kakavand-e Sharqi Rural District, Kakavand District, Delfan County, Lorestan Province, Iran. At the 2006 census, its population was 273, in 52 families.

References 

Towns and villages in Delfan County